Niels Island is one of the many uninhabited Canadian arctic islands in Qikiqtaaluk Region, Nunavut. It is located at the confluence of Hudson Strait and the Labrador Sea.

Niels Island, a member of the Button Islands, is small and lies southwest of Holdridge Island.

Other islands in the immediate vicinity include Clark Island, Dolphin Island, Holdridge Island, King Island, and Leading Island.

References 

Islands of Hudson Strait
Islands of the Labrador Sea
Uninhabited islands of Qikiqtaaluk Region